Shirin Ebadi (born 21 June 1947) is an Iranian political activist, lawyer, a former judge and human rights activist and founder of Defenders of Human Rights Center in Iran. On 10 October 2003, Ebadi was awarded the Nobel Peace Prize for her significant and pioneering efforts for democracy and human rights, especially women's, children's, and refugee rights.

She has lived in exile in London since 2009.

Life and early career as a judge 
Ebadi was born in Hamadan. Her father, Mohammad Ali Ebadi, was the city's chief notary public and a professor of commercial law. Her family moved to Tehran in 1948.

She was admitted to the law department of the University of Tehran in 1965 and in 1969, upon graduation, passed the qualification exams to become a judge. After a six-month internship period, she officially became a judge in March 1969. She continued her studies in University of Tehran in the meantime to pursue a doctorate's degree in law, in 1971, one of the her professor was Mahmoud Shehabi Khorassani. In 1975, she became the first woman president of the Tehran city court and served until the 1979 Iranian revolution. She was one of the first women judges in Iran.

As her applications were repeatedly rejected, Ebadi was not able to practice as a lawyer until 1993, while she already had a law office permit. She used this free time to write books and many articles in Iranian periodicals.

Ebadi as a lawyer 

By 2004 Ebadi was lecturing law at the University of Tehran while practicing law in Iran.  She is a campaigner for strengthening the legal status of children and women, the latter of which played a key role in the May 1997 landslide presidential election of the reformist Mohammad Khatami.

As a lawyer, she is known for taking up pro bono cases of dissident figures who have fallen foul of the judiciary. She has represented the family of Dariush Forouhar, a dissident intellectual and politician who was found stabbed to death at his home. His wife, Parvaneh Eskandari, was also killed at the same time.

The couple were among several dissidents who died in a spate of grisly murders that terrorized Iran's intellectual community. Suspicion fell on extremist hard-liners determined to put a stop to the more liberal climate fostered by President Khatami, who championed freedom of speech. The murders were found to be committed by a team of the employees of the Iranian Ministry of Intelligence, whose head, Saeed Emami, allegedly committed suicide in jail before being brought to court.

Ebadi also represented the family of Ezzat Ebrahim-Nejad, who was killed in the Iranian student protests in July 1999. In 2000 Ebadi was accused of manipulating the videotaped confession of Amir Farshad Ebrahimi, a former member of the Ansar-e Hezbollah. Ebrahimi confessed his involvement in attacks made by the organization on the orders of high-level conservative authorities, which have included the killing of Ezzat Ebrahim-Nejad  and attacks against members of President Khatami's cabinet. Ebadi claimed that she had only videotaped Amir Farshad Ebrahimi's confessions in order to present them to the court. This case was named "Tape makers" by hardliners who questioned the credibility of his videotaped deposition as well as his motives. Ebadi and Rohami were sentenced to five years in jail and suspension of their law licenses for sending Ebrahimi's videotaped deposition to President Khatami and the head of the Islamic judiciary. The sentences were later vacated by the Islamic judiciary's supreme court, but they did not forgive Ebarahimi's videotaped confession and sentenced him to 48 months jail, including 16 months in solitary confinement.  This case brought increased focus on Iran from human rights groups abroad.

Ebadi has also defended various child abuse cases, including the case of Arian Golshani, a child who was abused for years and then beaten to death by her father and stepbrother. This case gained international attention and caused controversy in Iran. Ebadi used this case to highlight Iran's problematic child custody laws, whereby custody of children in divorce is usually given to the father, even in the case of Arian, where her mother had told the court that the father was abusive and had begged for custody of her daughter. Ebadi also handled the case of Leila, a teenage girl who was gang-raped and murdered. Leila's family became homeless trying to cover the costs of the execution of the perpetrators owed to the government because in the Islamic Republic of Iran, it is the victim's family's responsibility to pay to restore their honor when a girl is raped by paying the government to execute the perpetrator. Ebadi was not able to achieve a victory in this case, but she brought international attention to this problematic law. Ebadi also handled a few cases dealing with bans of periodicals (including the cases of Habibollah Peyman, Abbas Marufi, and Faraj Sarkouhi). She has also established two non-governmental organizations in Iran with western funding, the Society for Protecting the Rights of the Child (SPRC) (1994) and the Defenders of Human Rights Center (DHRC) in 2001.

She also helped in the drafting of the original text of a law against physical abuse of children, which was passed by the Iranian parliament in 2002. Female members of Parliament also asked Ebadi to draft a law explaining how a woman's right to divorce her husband is in line with Sharia (Islamic Law). Ebadi presented the bill before the government, but the male members made her leave without considering the bill, according to Ebadi's memoir.

Political views 
In her book Iran Awakening, Ebadi explains her political/religious views on Islam, democracy and gender equality:
In the last 23 years, from the day I was stripped of my judgeship to the years of doing battle in the revolutionary courts of Tehran, I had repeated one refrain: an interpretation of Islam that is in harmony with equality and democracy is an authentic expression of faith. It is not religion that binds women, but the selective dictates of those who wish them cloistered. That belief, along with the conviction that change in Iran must come peacefully and from within, has underpinned my work."

At the same time, Ebadi expresses a nationalist love of Iran and a critical view of the Western world. She opposed the pro-Western Shah, initially supported the Islamic Revolution, and remembers the CIA's 1953 overthrow of prime minister Mohammad Mosaddeq with rage.

At a press conference shortly after the Peace Prize announcement, Ebadi herself explicitly rejected foreign interference in the country's affairs: "The fight for human rights is conducted in Iran by the Iranian people, and we are against any foreign intervention in Iran."

Subsequently, Ebadi has openly defended the Islamic regime's nuclear development programme:
Aside from being economically justified, it has become a cause of national pride for an old nation with a glorious history. No Iranian government, regardless of its ideology or democratic credentials, would dare to stop the program.

However, in a 2012 interview, Ebadi has stated:

The [Iranian] people want to stop enrichment but the government doesn't listen. Iran is situated on a fault line and people are scared of a Fukushima type of situation happening. We want peace, security, and economic welfare, and we cannot forgo all of our other rights for nuclear energy. The government claims it is not making a bomb. But I am not a member of the government, so I cannot speak to this directly. The fear is that if they do, Israel will be wiped out. If the Iranian people are able to topple the government, this could improve the situation. [In 2009] the people of Iran rose up and were badly suppressed. Right now, Iran is the country with the most journalists in prison. This is the price people are paying.

Ebadi also indirectly expressed her views on the Israeli–Palestinian conflict. In April 2010, Associated Students of the University of California passed a bill calling for the University to divest itself from what it saw as Israeli war crimes, by breaking ties with companies providing technology to the Israel Defense Forces. Shirin Ebadi, together with three other Peace Prize laureates, supported the bill.

Regarding her views on the Shia religion in Iran, she has said, after the Arabs came, and Iran converted to Islam, "Eventually we turned to the Shiite sect, which was different from the Arabs, who are Sunni" noting Persians were still Muslims but "We were Iranian."

Since the victory of Hassan Rouhani in the 2013 Iranian presidential election, Shirin Ebadi in various occasions has expressed her worry about the growing human rights violations in her homeland. Ebadi in her Dec. 2013 speech at Human Rights Day seminar at Leiden University angrily said: "I will shut up but the problems of Iran will not be solved".

In light of the increased power of ISIL, Ebadi communicated in April 2015 that she believes the Western world should spend money funding education and an end to corruption rather than fighting with guns and bombs. She reasons that because the Islamic State stems from an ideology based on a "wrong interpretation of Islam," physical force will not end ISIS because it will not end its beliefs.

In 2018, in an interview with Bloomberg, Ebadi stated her belief that the Islamic Republic has reached a point of which it is now un-reformable. Ebadi called for a referendum on the Islamic Republic.

Nobel Peace Prize  
On 10 October 2003, Ebadi was awarded the Nobel Peace Prize for her efforts for democracy and human rights, especially for the rights of women and children. The selection committee praised her as a "courageous person" who "has never heeded the threat to her own safety". Now she travels abroad lecturing in the West. She is against a policy of forced regime change.

The decision of the Nobel committee surprised some observers worldwide. Pope John Paul II had been predicted to win the Peace Prize amid speculation that he was nearing death. Some observers viewed Ebadi's selection as a calculated and political one along the lines of the selection of Lech Wałęsa and Mikhail Gorbachev, among others, for the award.  Furthermore, they suggested that Ebadi's activities were not directly related to the goals of the prize as originally expressed by Alfred Nobel.

She presented a book entitled Democracy, human rights, and Islam in modern Iran: Psychological, social and cultural perspectives to the Nobel Committee. The volume documents the historical and cultural basis of democracy and human rights from Cyrus and Darius, 2,500 years ago to Mohammad Mossadeq, the prime minister of modern Iran who nationalized the oil industry.

In her acceptance speech, Ebad criticized repression in Iran and insisted that Islam was compatible with democracy, human rights and freedom of opinion. In the same speech she also criticized US foreign policy, particularly the War on terrorism. She was the first Iranian and the first Muslim woman to receive the prize.

Thousands greeted her at the airport when she returned from Paris after receiving the news that she had won the prize. The response to the Award in Iran was mixed—enthusiastic supporters greeted her at the airport upon her return, the conservative media underplayed it, and then-Iranian President Mohammad Khatami criticized it as political. In Iran, officials of the Islamic Republic were either silent or critical of the selection of Ebadi, calling it a political act by a pro-Western institution and were also critical when Ebadi did not cover her hair at the Nobel award ceremony.  IRNA reported it in few lines that the evening newspapers and the Iranian state media waited hours to report the Nobel committee's decision—and then only as the last item on the radio news update. Reformist officials are said to have "generally welcomed the award", but "come under attack for doing so." Reformist president Mohammad Khatami did not officially congratulate Ms. Ebadi and stated that although the scientific Nobels are important, the Peace Prize is "not very important" and was awarded to Ebadi on the basis of "totally political criteria".  Vice President Mohammad Ali Abtahi, the only official to initially congratulate Ebadi, defended the president saying "abusing the President's words about Ms. Ebadi is tantamount to abusing the prize bestowed on her for political considerations".

In 2009, Norway's Foreign Minister Jonas Gahr Støre, published a statement reporting that Ebadi's Nobel Peace Prize had been confiscated by Iranian authorities and that "This [was] the first time a Nobel Peace Prize ha[d] been confiscated by national authorities." Iran denied the charges.

Post-Nobel prize 

Since receiving the Nobel Prize Ebadi has lectured, taught and received awards in different countries, issued statements and defended people accused of political crimes in Iran. She has travelled to and spoken to audiences in India, the United States, and other countries; released her autobiography in an English translation. With five other Nobel laureates, she created the Nobel Women's Initiative to promote peace, justice and equality for women. In 2019, Ebadi called for a treaty to end violence against women, in support of Every Woman Coalition.

Threats 
In April 2008 she told Reuters news agency that Iran's human rights record had regressed in the past two years and agreed to defend Baháʼís arrested in Iran in May 2008.

In April 2008 Ebadi released a statement saying: "Threats against my life and security and those of my family, which began some time ago, have intensified," and that the threats warned her against making speeches abroad, and to stop defending Iran's persecuted Baháʼí community. In August 2008, the IRNA news agency published an article attacking Ebadi's links to the Baháʼí Faith and accused her of seeking support from the West. It also criticized Ebadi for defending homosexuals, appearing without the Islamic headscarf abroad, questioning Islamic punishments, and "defending CIA agents." It accused her daughter, Nargess Tavassolian, of conversion to the Baháʼí faith, a capital offense in the Islamic Republic. However Shirin Ebadi has denied it saying;"I am proud to say that my family and I are Shiites,"  Her daughter believes "the government wanted to scare my mother with this scenario." Ebadi believes the attacks are in retaliation for her agreeing to defend the families of the seven Baháʼís arrested in May.

In December 2008, Iranian police shut down the office of a human rights group led by her.  Another human rights group, Human Rights Watch, has said it was "extremely worried" about Ebadi's safety.

Seizure 
Ebadi said while in London in late November 2009 that her Nobel Peace Prize medal and diploma had been taken from their bank box alongside her Légion d'honneur and a ring she had received from Germany's association of journalists. She said they had been taken by the Revolutionary Court approximately three weeks previously. Ebadi also said her bank account was frozen by authorities. Norwegian Minister of Foreign Affairs Jonas Gahr Støre expressed his "shock and disbelief" at the incident. The Iranian foreign ministry subsequently denied the confiscation, and also criticized Norway for interfering in Iran's affairs.

Post-Nobel Prize timeline 

2003 November – She declared that she would provide legal representation for the family of the murdered Canadian freelance photographer Zahra Kazemi. The trial was halted in July 2004, prompting Ebadi and her team to leave the court in protest that their witnesses had not been heard.
2004 – During the World Social Forum- Bombay, January 2004 – Ebadi, speaking at a small girls' school run by an NGO, "Sahyog", proposed that 30 January (the day Mahatma Gandhi fell to a Hindu extremist's bullets) be observed as International Day of Non-Violence. This proposal was brought to her by school children in Paris by their Indian teacher Akshay Bakaya. 3 years later Sonia Gandhi and Archbishop Desmond Tutu relayed the idea at the Delhi Satyagraha Convention January 2007, preferring however to propose Gandhi's birthday 2 October. The UN General Assembly on 15 June 2007 adopted 2 October as the International Day of Non-Violence.
2004 – Ebadi was listed by Forbes magazine as one of the "100 most powerful women in the world". She is also included in a published list of the "100 most influential women of all time."
2005 Spring – Ebadi taught a course on "Islam and Human Rights" at the University of Arizona's James E. Rogers College of Law in Tucson, Arizona.
2005  (12 May) – Ebadi delivered an address on Senior Class Day at Vanderbilt University, Nashville, Tennessee, USA. Vanderbilt Chancellor Gordon Gee presented Ebadi with the Chancellor's Medal for her human rights work.
2005 – Ebadi was voted the world's 12th leading public intellectual in The 2005 Global Intellectuals Poll by Prospect (UK).
2006 – Random House released her first book for a Western audience, Iran Awakening: A Memoir of Revolution and Hope, with Azadeh Moaveni. A reading of the book was serialised as BBC Radio 4's Book of the Week in September 2006. American novelist David Ebershoff served as the book's editor.
2006 – Ebadi was one of the founders of The Nobel Women's Initiative along with sister Nobel Peace laureates Betty Williams, Mairead Corrigan Maguire, Wangari Maathai, Jody Williams and Rigoberta Menchú Tum. Six women representing North America and South America, Europe, the Middle East and Africa decided to bring together their experiences in a united effort for peace with justice and equality. It is the goal of the Nobel Women's Initiative to help strengthen work being done in support of women's rights around the world.
2007 (17 May) – Ebadi announced that she would defend the Iranian American scholar Haleh Esfandiari, who is jailed in Tehran.
2008 March – Ebadi tells Reuters news agency that Iran's human rights record had regressed in the past two years.
2008  (14 April) – Ebadi released a statement saying "Threats against my life and security and those of my family, which began some time ago, have intensified," and that the threats warned her against making speeches abroad, and against defending Iran's persecuted Baháʼí community.
2008 June – Ebadi volunteered to be the lawyer for the arrested Baháʼí leadership of Iran in June.
2008  (7 August) – Ebadi announced via the Muslim Network for Baháʼí Rights that she would defend in court the seven Baháʼí leaders arrested in the spring.
2008  (1 September) – Ebadi published her book Refugee Rights in Iran exposing the lack of rights given to Afghan refugees living in Iran.
2008  (21 December) Ebadi's office of the Center for the Defense of Human Rights raided and closed.
2008  (29 December) – Islamic authorities close Ebadi's Center for Defenders of Human Rights, raiding her private office, seizing her computers and files. Worldwide condemnation of raid.
2009  (1 January) – Pro-regime "demonstrators" attack Ebadi's home and office.
2009  (12 June) – Ebadi was at a seminar in Spain at the time of Iranian presidential election. "[W]hen the crackdown began colleagues told her not to come home" and as of October 2009 she has not returned to Iran.
2009  (16 June) – In the midst of nationwide protests against the very surprising and highly suspect election results giving incumbent President Mahmoud Ahmadinejad a landslide victory, Ebadi calls for new elections in an interview with Radio Free Europe.
2009  (24 September) – Touring abroad to lobby international leaders and highlight the Islamic regime's human rights abuses since June, Ebadi criticizes the British government for putting talks on the Islamic regime's nuclear programme ahead of protesting its brutal suppression of opposition. Noting the British Ambassador attended President Ahmadinejad's inauguration, she said, "`That's when I felt that human rights were being neglected. ... Undemocratic countries are more dangerous than a nuclear bomb. It's undemocratic countries that jeopardise international peace.`" She calls for "the downgrading of Western embassies, the withdrawal of ambassadors and the freezing of the assets of Iran's leaders."
2009 November – The Iranian authorities seize Ebadi's Nobel medal together with other belongings from her safe-deposit box.
2009  (29 December) – Ebadi's sister Noushin Ebadi was detained apparently in an effort to silence Ebadi who is abroad.  "She was neither politically active nor had a role in any rally. It's necessary to point out that in the past two months she had been summoned several times to the Intelligence Ministry, who told her to persuade me to give up my human rights activities. I have been arrested solely because of my activities in human rights," Ebadi said.
2010 (June) – Ebadi's husband denounced her on state television.  According to Ebadi this was a coerced confession after his arrest and torture.
2012 (26 January) — in a statement released by the International Campaign for Human Rights in Iran, Ebadi called on "all freedom-loving people across the globe" to work for the release of three opposition leaders — Zahra Rahnavard, Mir Hossein Mousavi, and Mehdi Karroubi — who have been confined to house arrest for nearly a year.

Lawsuits

Lawsuit against the United States 
In 2004, Ebadi filed a lawsuit against the U.S. Department of Treasury because of restrictions she faced over publishing her memoir in the United States. American trade laws include prohibitions on writers from embargoed countries. The law also banned American literary agent Wendy Strothman from working with Ebadi. Azar Nafisi wrote a letter in support of Ebadi. Nafisi said that the law infringes on the First Amendment. After a long legal battle, Ebadi won and was able to publish her memoir in the United States.

Other activities 
 Apne Aap Women Worldwide, Co-Chair of the International Advisory Board
 Aurora Prize, Member of the Selection Committee (since 2015)
 Business for Peace Award Committee, Member (2009)
 Reporters Without Borders (RWB), Member of the Emeritus Board
 Scholars at Risk (SAR), Member of the Ambassadors Council
 Nuremberg International Human Rights Award, Member of the Jury (2004–2020)

Recognition

Awards 
 Awarded plate by Human Rights Watch, 1996
 Official spectator of Human Rights Watch, 1996
 Awarded Rafto Prize, Human Rights Prize in Norway, 2001
 Nobel Peace Prize in October 2003
 Women's eNews 21 Leaders for the 21st Century Award, 2004
 International Democracy Award, 2004
 James Parks Morton Interfaith Award from the Interfaith Center of New York, 2004
 ‘Lawyer of the Year’ award, 2004
 UCI Citizen Peacebuilding Award, 2005
 The Golden Plate Award by the American Academy of Achievement, 2005
 Legion of Honor award, 2006
Toleranzpreis der Evangelischen Akademie Tutzing, 2008
 Award for the Global Defence of Human Rights, International Service Human Rights Award, 2009
 Wolfgang Friedmann Memorial Award, Columbia Journal of Transnational Law, 2013

Honorary degrees 
 Doctor of Laws, Williams College, 2004
 Doctor of Laws, Brown University, 2004
 Doctor of Laws, University of British Columbia, 2004
 Honorary doctorate, University of Maryland, College Park, 2004
 Honorary doctorate, University of Toronto, 2004
 Honorary doctorate, Simon Fraser University, 2004
 Honorary doctorate, University of Akureyri, 2004
 Honorary doctorate, Australian Catholic University, 2005
 Honorary doctorate, University of San Francisco, 2005
 Honorary doctorate, Concordia University, 2005
 Honorary doctorate, The University of York, The University of Canada, 2005
 Honorary doctorate, Université Jean Moulin in Lyon, 2005
 Honorary doctorate, Loyola University Chicago, 2007
 Honorary Doctorate The New School University, 2007
 Honorary Doctor of Laws, Marquette University, 2009
 Honorary Doctor of Law, University of Cambridge, 2011
 Honorary Doctorate, School of Oriental and African Studies (SOAS) University of London, 2012
 Honorary Doctor of Laws, Law Society of Upper Canada, 2012

Books published 
 Iran Awakening: One Woman's Journey to Reclaim Her Life and Country (2007) 
 Refugee Rights in Iran (2008) 
 The Golden Cage: Three brothers, Three choices, One destiny (2011) 
 Until We Are Free (2016)

See also 
 Iranian women
 List of famous Persian women
 List of peace activists
 Intellectual movements in Iran
 Persian women's movement
 Islamic feminism

References

Further reading 

Monshipouri, M. (2009). "Shirin Ebadi" in Encyclopedia of human rights. Volume 2. David Forsythe (Ed.). Oxford University Press. ISBN 978-0-19-533402-9

External links 

 
 Shirin Ebadi's biography, Iowa State University
 Gruber Distinguished Lecture in Global Justice: Dr. Shirin Ebadi, Yale Law School
 Nobel Women's Initiative
 Quotes from Shirin Ebadi Speeches
 TIME.com: 10 Questions for Shirin Ebadi
 Shirin Ebadi, avocate pour les droits de l'homme en Iran Jean Albert, Ludivine Tomasso and edited by Jacqueline Duband, Emilie Dessens
Press interviews
 Iranian elections – Nobel Peace Prize winner Shirin Ebadi talks to Euronews 2013.June.12
 David Batty in conversation with Shirin Ebadi, "If you want to help Iran, don't attack", The Guardian, 13 June 2008
 Shirin Ebadi interviewed by Alyssa McDonald on New Statesman
 Nermeen Shaikh, AsiaSource Interview with Shirin Ebadi
"Iran's Quiet Revolution" Winter 2007 article from Ms. magazine about activism and feminism in Iran.
Video
 Video: Shirin Ebadi on 'What's Ahead for Iran', Asia Society, New York, 3 March 2010
 Shirin Ebadi Presses Iran on Human Rights and Warns Against International Sanctions – video by Democracy Now!
 
Pictures
 Picture Gallery

1947 births
Living people
Iranian democracy activists
Iranian dissidents
Iranian human rights activists
Iranian women activists
Iranian women's rights activists
Iranian exiles
Children's rights activists
Iranian feminists
Iranian emigrants to the United Kingdom
Nobel Peace Prize laureates
Iranian Nobel laureates
Academic staff of the University of Tehran
University of Tehran alumni
People from Hamadan
Commandeurs of the Légion d'honneur
Iranian women lawyers
Iranian women judges
Pacifist feminists
Recipients of the Legion of Honour
Women Nobel laureates
Iranian women writers
Iranian writers
Nonviolence advocates
Carnegie Council for Ethics in International Affairs
Members of the National Council for Peace